The 1978 Macdonald Lassies Championship, the Canadian women's curling championship was held February 26 to March 2, 1978, at the Sault Memorial Gardens in Sault Ste. Marie, Ontario.

Team Manitoba, who was skipped by Cathy Pidzarko won the event by finishing round robin play with a 7–3 record.

This would be the last women's championship to have a champion determined by round robin and the last one before the creation of the Women's World Curling Championship.

Teams
The teams are listed as follows:

Round Robin standings
Final round robin standings

Round Robin results
All draw times are listed in Eastern Standard Time (UTC-05:00).

Draw 1
Sunday, February 26, 2:30 pm

Draw 2
Sunday, February 26, 7:30 pm

Draw 3
Monday, February 27, 2:00 pm

Draw 4
Monday, February 27, 7:30 pm

Draw 5
Tuesday, February 28, 9:00 am

Draw 6
Tuesday, February 28, 2:00 pm

Draw 7
Tuesday, February 28, 7:30 pm

Draw 8
Wednesday, March 1, 2:00 pm

Draw 9
Wednesday, March 1, 7:30 pm

Draw 10
Thursday, March 2, 2:00 pm

Draw 11
Tuesday, March 2, 7:00 pm

References

External links
Coverage on CurlingZone

Scotties Tournament of Hearts
Macdonald Lassies
Sport in Sault Ste. Marie, Ontario
Curling in Northern Ontario
Macdonald Lassies Championship
Macdonald Lassies Championship
Macdonald Lassies Championship
Macdonald Lassies Championship